Luther Crawford Ladd (22 December 1843 – 19 April 1861) was a soldier in the Union Army who was killed during the Baltimore riot of 1861. He is often referred to as the first Union soldier killed in action during the American Civil War. Four days earlier, Private Daniel Hough became the first non-combat casualty of the war when he was accidentally killed by a cannon that went off prematurely during a salute to the flag. Luther Crawford Ladd was 17 years old at the time of his death.

Luther C. Ladd was born in Bristol, New Hampshire, the son of John Ladd. He resided on the Ladd farm, south of Fowler's River. In 1853 Luther and his father moved to nearby Alexandria, New Hampshire where he attended district schools. At age 16 in 1860, Ladd left Alexandria for Lowell, Massachusetts where he obtained employment at the Lowell Machine Shop. In April 1861 Luther answered President Lincoln's first call for 75,000 men by enlisting for three months in Co. D, 6th Massachusetts Militia. On April 19, 1861 while marching through the city of Baltimore this regiment was attacked by an angry mob. Luther C. Ladd was the first to fall. His injuries included a fractured skull and a fatal bullet wound that severed an artery in his thigh. Luther C. Ladd's remains were interred in the Alexandria Village Cemetery, later to be removed and buried beneath the Ladd & Whitney monument in Lowell, Massachusetts.

References

1843 births
1861 deaths
1861 in the United States
1861 riots
People from Bristol, New Hampshire
People of New Hampshire in the American Civil War
Union military personnel killed in the American Civil War
Union Army soldiers